Merkez means "center" or "hub" in Turkish. It may refer to:

 The central districts of the Provinces of Turkey, often (but not always) bearing the same name as the province (e.g. Mersin is the central district of Mersin Province)
 Merkez Park, an urban park along the Seyhan River, in Adana, Turkey
 Merkezefendi, a planned district and second level municipality in Denizli Province, Turkey
 Merkezefendi Cemetery, in the Merkezefendi neighborhood, Zeytinburnu district, Istanbul, Turkey